Folding-book manuscripts are a type of writing material historically used in Mainland Southeast Asia, particularly in the areas of present-day Myanmar, Thailand, Laos and Cambodia. They are known as parabaik in Burmese, samut thai in Thai or samut khoi in Thai and Lao, phap sa in Northern Thai and Lao, and kraing in Khmer.

The manuscripts are made of a thick paper, usually of the Siamese rough bush (khoi in Thai and Lao) tree or paper mulberry, glued into a very long sheet and folded in a concertina fashion, with the front and back lacquered to form protective covers or attached to decorative wood covers. The unbound books are made in either white or black varieties, with the paper being undyed in the former and blackened with soot or lacquer in the latter.

Myanmar
Along with paper made from bamboo and palm leaves, parabaik (ပုရပိုက်) were the main medium for writing and drawing in early modern Burma/Myanmar. The Universities' Central Library in Yangon houses the country's largest collection of traditional manuscripts, including 4,000 parabaiks.

There are two types of parabaik: historically, black parabaik were the main medium of writing while the white parabaik were used for paintings and drawings. The extant black parabaik consist of works of scientific and technical importance like medicine, mathematics, astronomy, astrology, history, social and economic commentary, music, historical ballads, fiction, poetry, etc. The extant white parabaik show colored drawings of kings and court activities, stories, social customs and manners, houses, dresses, hair styles, ornaments, &c. The majority of Burmese chronicles were originally written on parabaik. A 1979 UN study finds that "thousands upon thousands" of rolls of ancient parabaik were found (usually in monasteries and in homes of private collectors) across the country but the vast majority were not properly maintained.

Thailand

The use of samut khoi in Thailand dates at least to the Ayutthaya period (14th–18th centuries). They were used for secular texts including royal chronicles, legal documents and works of literature, as well as some Buddhist texts, though palm-leaf manuscripts were more commonly used for religious texts.

Illustrated folding books were produced for a range of different purposes in Thai Buddhist monasteries and at royal and local courts. They served as handbooks and chanting manuals for Buddhist monks and novices. Producing folding books or sponsoring them was regarded as especially meritorious. They often, therefore, functioned as presentation volumes in honor of the deceased. A commonly reproduced work in the samut khoi format is the legend of Phra Malai, a Buddhist monk who travelled to heaven and hell. Such manuscripts are often richly illustrated.

Cambodia
The paper used for Khmer books, known as kraing, was made from the bark of the mulberry tree. In what is now known as Cambodia, kraing literature was stored in pagodas across the country. During the Cambodian civil war and the subsequent Khmer Rouge regime of the 1960s and 1970s, as many as 80% of the pagodas in Cambodia were destroyed, including their libraries. In Cambodia, only a tiny fraction of the original kraing of the Khmer Empire have survived.

See also 
Ho trai, library of Thai Temple
Pitakataik, scriptural libraries in Myanmar 
Palm-leaf manuscript
Orihon, a concertina-folded book format originating in China and popularized in Japan

Notes

References

Citations

Bibliography
 .
 
 

Books by type
Burmese culture
Burmese Buddhist texts
Thai culture
Thai literature
Manuscripts by type